The Staffordshire helmet is an Anglo-Saxon helmet discovered in 2009 as part of the Staffordshire Hoard. It is part of the largest discovery of contemporary gold and silver metalwork in Britain, which contained more than 4,000 precious fragments, approximately a third of which came from a single high-status helmet. Following those found at Benty Grange (1848), Sutton Hoo (1939), Coppergate (1982), Wollaston (1997), and Shorwell (2004), it is only the sixth known Anglo-Saxon helmet.

The helmet, along with the entire hoard, was purchased jointly by the Birmingham Museum & Art Gallery and the Potteries Museum & Art Gallery, and is currently undergoing conservation work. In 2012 a second find of metalwork, including the second cheek guard, was made at the original site.

The helmet is believed to have been made around AD 600-650. Two replicas of the crested helmet have been made for display in the museums in Birmingham and Stoke.

References

Bibliography 
  
  
Appendix 3
  
 
 
  
 
 
 
 
 
  
 
  
  

2009 archaeological discoveries
Anglo-Saxon art
Archaeological discoveries in the United Kingdom
Medieval helmets
Medieval European metalwork objects
Individual helmets
Collections of Birmingham Museum and Art Gallery